A Neo-Dutch style mansion was designed in 1935. Completed in 1941, this mansion located on Grant's Hill served as residence for the Governor General of the Union of South Africa from 1942.

In 1972, the building was officially named Oliewenhuis, the name derived from the abundance of wild olive trees growing on the hills nearby. In 1985 the building became an art museum.

See also
Government Houses of South Africa
Government Houses of the British Empire

References

Houses completed in 1941
Official residences in South Africa
Government Houses of the British Empire and Commonwealth
Orange Free State
20th-century architecture in South Africa